Lance Watson (4 January 1931 – 17 October 2014) was an Australian rules footballer who played with Fitzroy in the Victorian Football League (VFL).

Notes

External links 		
		

		
2014 deaths		
1931 births
Australian rules footballers from Victoria (Australia)		
Fitzroy Football Club players